The Women's 200 metre butterfly competition at the 2019 World Championships was held on 24 and 25 July 2019.

Records
Prior to the competition, the existing world and championship records were as follows.

Results

Heats
The heats were held on 24 July at 11:12.

Semifinals
The semifinals were held on 24 July at 21:10.

Semifinal 1

Semifinal 2

Final
The final was held on 25 July at 20:02.

References

Women's 200 metre butterfly
2019 in women's swimming